Alfred Neumann may refer to:
Alfred Neumann (architect) (1900–1968)
Alfred Neumann (East Germany) (1909–2001), politician
Alfred Neumann (writer) (1895–1952)
Alfred R. Neumann, first president of the University of Houston at Clear Lake City

See also 

 Alfred Newman (disambiguation)
 Alfred E. Neuman, fictional mascot of Mad magazine